Halolaguna flabellata is a moth in the family Lecithoceridae. It is found in Guangxi, China.

The wingspan is 16–16.5 mm. The ground colour of the forewings is dark brown with a pale yellow subapical spot. The discal and discocellular spots are blackish brown. The hindwings are grey, but yellowish white basally.

Etymology
The species name refers to the basally fan-shaped uncus and is derived from Latin flabellatus (meaning fan shaped).

References

Moths described in 2014
Halolaguna